Rovshan Mustafayev (born 5 October 1960, Baku – died 20 February 2009, Istanbul) was an Azerbaijani political scientist.

Mustafayev established the first independent center for analytics in Azerbaijan in 1993. He published the scientific and political papers Dirçeliş XXI asır (Russian: Vozrajdenie-XXI vek). He also found and served as the head of the Human Rights Institute under the Azerbaijan National Sciences Academy. Having published more than 70 scientific articles and books, he represented Azerbaijan in many international conferences.

Mustafayev’s most well known works are concerning the March Days.

He was married to Aytən Mustafayeva. Following a long illness, Mustafayev died at the age of 48 in Memorial Hospital, Turkey.

References

1960 births
2009 deaths
Azerbaijani political scientists
Azerbaijani professors
Mountain Jews
20th-century political scientists